Tazeh Kand-e Aliabad (also Romanized as Tāzeh Kand-e ‘Alīābād; also known as Tāzeh Kand-e Qāsem Khān) is a village in Sarajuy-ye Shomali Rural District, in the Central District of Maragheh County, East Azerbaijan Province, Iran. At the 2006 census, its population was 356, in 77 families.

References 

Towns and villages in Maragheh County